"Stargazing" (stylized in all caps) is a song by American rapper and singer Travis Scott. It was released as the first and only promotional single and first track off of his third studio album, Astroworld, along with the album on August 3, 2018. The song debuted at number eight on the Billboard Hot 100, and was later certified platinum by the Recording Industry Association of America (RIAA).

Composition
In the song, Travis Scott sings about how overcoming his past ways and abstinence from lean has helped him become a better influence. Midway through, his voice "shifts to a falsetto", and the beat switches.

Critical reception
The song received critical acclaim from critics and is considered a highlight on Astroworld. Writing for Pitchfork, Michelle Kim gave the song a positive review, calling it a "potent earworm" and named it a "best new track". Reviewing Astroworld for The Fader, Ben Dandridge-Lemco praised Scott as sounding "dexterous" over the song's "dizzying" production, adding that the song's beat switch served as the album's "first loop-de-loop". In Consequence of Sounds review for the album, Wren Graves listed the song as an "essential track" and praised the two halves of the track, saying, "Scott balances the two ideas like a chef balancing sweet and sour, enhancing each with the inclusion of the other."

Music video
The official music video for the song came in the form of the official trailer for Astroworld, which was released to Scott's YouTube channel on July 30, 2018. It features the first half of the song and was directed by Nabil.

Live performances
Travis Scott performed the song at the 2018 MTV Video Music Awards.

Charts

Weekly charts

Year-end charts

Certifications

References

External links
 

Travis Scott songs
2018 songs
Songs written by Travis Scott
Songs written by Mike Dean (record producer)
Songs written by Cyhi the Prynce
Songs written by 30 Roc
Songs written by Sonny Digital
Songs written by Bkorn
Songs about drugs
Cactus Jack Records singles
Music videos directed by Nabil Elderkin